Sebago is a town in Cumberland County, Maine, United States. The population was 1,911 at the 2020 census. It is part of the Portland–South Portland–Biddeford, Maine metropolitan statistical area.

History

Originally called Flintstown, it was granted in 1774 by the Massachusetts General Court to survivors of Captain John Flint's company of soldiers from Concord, Massachusetts. It replaced a grant of 1735 that awarded them Township No. 3 (now Walpole, New Hampshire), but which was ruled invalid when the border between Massachusetts and New Hampshire was redrawn to satisfy prior claims by the descendants of John Mason. On June 23, 1802, Flintstown was incorporated as Baldwin. Then on February 10, 1826, Sebago was set off from Baldwin and incorporated as a separate town. It took the name of Sebago Lake. Land was annexed from Denmark in 1830, and taken in 1834 to help form Naples.

Lumberjacks and woodsmen were the first European inhabitants of the area, but they left as soon as the first growth of pine was cut. It 1790, Joseph Lakin from Groton, Massachusetts, built a cabin, then returned with his family and possessions. The surface of the town is very uneven and generally rocky, so it was hard work to clear a farm for cultivation. But the soil was good and yielded abundant crops. Mills were built at water power sites, and products included long and short lumber, shooks, and boots and shoes. In 1832, the Cumberland and Oxford Canal opened, increasing trade between Sebago Lake and Portland. In the early 1870s, the Portland and Ogdensburg Railroad carried tourists and freight to Sebago Lake Station in Standish, where steamboats took them to various landings around the lake. Inns, hotels and summer camps opened, and the town became a recreation area, which it remains today.

In 1906, the Order of Sir Galahad, an Episcopal youth organization, established Camp O-AT-KA in East Sebago.

Geography

Situated beside Sebago Lake, Sebago is drained by the Northwest River and Mill Brook.

The town is crossed by state routes 11, 107 and 114. It is bordered by the towns of Bridgton to the north, Naples to the northeast, Baldwin and Standish to the south, and Denmark and Hiram to the west.

Demographics

2010 census

As of the census of 2010, there were 1,719 people, 724 households, and 484 families living in the town. The racial makeup of the town was 97.1% White, 0.3% African American, 0.9% Native American, 0.2% Asian, and 1.5% from two or more races. Hispanic or Latino of any race were 0.3% of the population.

There were 724 households, of which 26.1% had children under the age of 18 living with them, 54.1% were married couples living together, 6.5% had a female householder with no husband present, 6.2% had a male householder with no wife present, and 33.1% were non-families. Of all households 25.8% were made up of individuals, and 7.6% had someone living alone who was 65 years of age or older. The average household size was 2.37 and the average family size was 2.80.

The median age in the town was 44.7 years. 20.2% of residents were under the age of 18; 6.7% were between the ages of 18 and 24; 23.5% were from 25 to 44; 33.7% were from 45 to 64; and 15.8% were 65 years of age or older. The gender makeup of the town was 51.2% male and 48.8% female.

2000 census

As of the census of 2000, there were 1,433 people, 584 households, and 412 families living in the town. The racial makeup of the town was 98.33% White, 0.35% African American, 0.07% Native American, 0.14% Asian, 0.07% from other races, and 1.05% from two or more races. Hispanic or Latino of any race were 0.35% of the population.

There were 584 households, out of which 27.6% had children under the age of 18 living with them, 61.3% were married couples living together, 5.8% had a female householder with no husband present, and 29.3% were non-families. Of all households 22.4% were made up of individuals, and 9.4% had someone living alone who was 65 years of age or older.  The average household size was 2.45 and the average family size was 2.86.

In the town, the population was spread out, with 23.1% under the age of 18, 4.7% from 18 to 24, 27.8% from 25 to 44, 29.7% from 45 to 64, and 14.8% who were 65 years of age or older.  The median age was 42 years. For every 100 females, there were 98.2 males.  For every 100 females age 18 and over, there were 95.4 males.

The median income for a household in the town was $40,391, and the median income for a family was $43,512. Males had a median income of $33,083 versus $25,139 for females. The per capita income for the town was $18,995.  About 4.0% of families and 5.8% of the population were below the poverty line, including 7.6% of those under age 18 and 3.3% of those age 65 or over.

Sites of interest

 Douglas Mountain
 Sebago Historical Society & Museum

Notable people

 George Herbert Babb, state legislator
 Vinal G. Good, state legislator and insurance agent

References

External links

 Town of Sebago official website
 Spaulding Memorial Library
 Town Information from Maine.gov
 Epodunk Profile
 Maine Genealogy: Sebago, Cumberland County, Maine

 
Portland metropolitan area, Maine
Towns in Cumberland County, Maine